Mikkwakhola  is a Gaupalika(Nepali: गाउपालिका ; gaupalika)(Formerly: village development committee) located in Taplejung District in the Mechi Zone of eastern Nepal. The local body was formed by merging four VDCs namelyKhokling, Liwang, Sanwa, Papung. Currently, it has a total of 7 wards. The population of the rural municipality is 9,160 according to the data collected on 2017 Nepalese local elections.

Population 
As per 2017, Mikkwakhola hosts a population of 9,160 across a total area of 442.96 km2.

See also
Taplejung District

References

Rural municipalities in Koshi Province
Rural municipalities in Taplejung District
Rural municipalities of Nepal established in 2017